Delmont is a city in southeastern Douglas County, South Dakota, United States. The population was 153 at the 2020 census.

Delmont was laid out in 1886.

Geography
Delmont is located at  (43.267013, -98.162996).

Delmont has been assigned the ZIP code 57330 and the FIPS place code 16060.

Demographics

2010 census
At the 2010 census, there were 234 people, 110 households and 61 families residing in the city. The racial make-up was 83.3% White, 3.0% African American, 9.0% Native American, 1.7% from other races, and 3.0% from two or more races. Hispanic or Latino of any race were 3.4% of the population.

There were 110 households, of which 22.7% had children under the age of 18 living with them, 46.4% were married couples living together, 5.5% had a female householder with no husband present, 3.6% had a male householder with no wife present, and 44.5% were non-families. 37.3% of all households were made up of individuals, and 19.1% had someone living alone who was 65 years of age or older. The average household size was 2.13 and the average family size was 2.87.

The median age was 50.7 years. 20.5% of residents were under the age of 18; 6.4% were between the ages of 18 and 24; 15.8% were from 25 to 44; 34.2% were from 45 to 64; and 23.1% were 65 years of age or older. The gender makeup of the city was 53.4% male and 46.6% female.

2000 census
At the 2000 census, there were 263 people, 114 households and 68 families residing in the city. The racial make-up was 91.63% White, 7.60% Native American, 0.38% Asian, and 0.38% from two or more races. Hispanic or Latino of any race were 0.76% of the population.

There were 114 households, of which 26.3% had children under the age of 18 living with them, 50.9% were married couples living together, 6.1% had a female householder with no husband present, and 39.5% were non-families. 35.1% of all households were made up of individuals, and 18.4% had someone living alone who was 65 years of age or older. The average household size was 2.31 and the average family size was 3.04.

25.1% of the population were under the age of 18, 6.1% from 18 to 24, 22.8% from 25 to 44, 24.3% from 45 to 64, and 21.7% who were 65 years of age or older. The median age was 43 years. For every 100 females, there were 90.6 males. For every 100 females age 18 and over, there were 89.4 males.

The median household income was $23,750 and the median family income was $33,000. Males had a median income of $24,583 and females $16,667. The per capita income was $12,385. About 18.2% of families and 19.6% of the population were below the poverty line, including 20.7% of those under the age of eighteen and 17.5% of those 65 or over.

May 2015 tornado
On 10 May 2015, Delmont was hit by a strong EF2 tornado. It cut a path through the western side of town, destroying many buildings. The destruction included Zion Lutheran Church, which was more than a century old. Governor Dennis Daugaard declared a state of emergency and alerted the National Guard to help with clean-up efforts. Despite the scale of the damage, only nine people were injured and no one was killed. In June 2015, the mayor said that half of the town's residents would not come back and rebuild.

See also
 List of cities in South Dakota

References

External links

Cities in South Dakota
Cities in Douglas County, South Dakota